Chaetocarpus ferrugineus is a plant of the family Peraceae which is endemic to Sri Lanka.

Ecology
Rainforest understory wet zone.

Uses
Wood – fuelwood.

Culture

References

 

Peraceae
Endemic flora of Sri Lanka